Sé is a central station on Line 1 (Blue) and Line 3 (Red) of the São Paulo Metro. It is located under the Praça da Sé, next to the São Paulo Cathedral. It was officially inaugurated on 17 February 1978.

References

São Paulo Metro stations
Railway stations opened in 1978
Railway stations located underground in Brazil
1978 establishments in Brazil